Pitcaple railway station is a former railway station in Aberdeenshire. It opened on 20 September 1854, and closed down on 6 May 1968. It was part of the Great North of Scotland Railway.

Location 
The Pitcaple railway station was located at the northern part of the hamlet of Pitcaple. It was near to the Inverurie railway station, Lethenty station, and the Old Meldrum Railway.

Building 
There were two rectangular buildings which made the railway station. The station was made of timber and clad and had two brick chimneys. The building only partially survives as of 14 November 2013.

References

Notes

Sources

Further reading 

Disused railway stations in Aberdeenshire
Beeching closures in Scotland
Former Great North of Scotland Railway stations
Railway stations in Great Britain opened in 1854
Railway stations in Great Britain closed in 1968
1854 establishments in Scotland
1968 disestablishments in Scotland